{{Infobox film
| name           = Evil Angels
| image          = EVILANGELS.jpg
| caption        = Theatrical release poster
| director       = Fred Schepisi
| producer       = Verity Lambert
| screenplay     = Robert CaswellFred Schepisi
| based_on       = 
| starring       = 
| music          = Bruce Smeaton
| cinematography = Ian Baker
| editing        = Jill Bilcock
| distributor    = Warner Bros. (United States)Roadshow Entertainment (Australia)Cannon Films (International)
| released       = 
| runtime        = 121 minutes
| country        = Australia United States
| language       = English
| budget         = $15 million
| gross          = $6.9 million (United States)<ref>"Box Office Information for: 'A Cry in the Dark'. " Box Office Mojo. Retrieved: 14 April 2012.</ref>
}}Evil Angels (released as A Cry in the Dark outside Australia and New Zealand) is a 1988 Australian drama film directed by Fred Schepisi. The screenplay by Schepisi and Robert Caswell is based on John Bryson's 1985 book of the same name. It chronicles the case of Azaria Chamberlain, a nine-week-old baby girl who disappeared from a campground near Ayers Rock in August 1980 and the struggle of her parents, Michael Chamberlain and Lindy Chamberlain, to prove their innocence to a public convinced that they were complicit in her death. Meryl Streep and Sam Neill star as the Chamberlains.

The film was released less than two months after the Chamberlains were exonerated by the Northern Territory Court of Appeals of all charges filed against them. The film received generally favourable reviews, with Streep's performance receiving high praise and a nomination for the Academy Award for Best Actress, but was a box office disappointment, grossing only $6.9 million against its $15 million budget.

Plot
Seventh-day Adventist Church pastor Michael Chamberlain, his wife Lindy Chamberlain, their two sons, and their nine-week-old daughter Azaria are on a camping holiday in the Australian Outback. With the baby sleeping in their tent, the family enjoys a barbecue with their fellow campers when a cry is heard. Lindy returns to the tent to check and is certain she sees a dingo with something in its mouth running off as she approaches. When she discovers the infant is missing, everyone joins forces to search for her, without success. It is assumed what Lindy saw was the animal carrying Azaria, and a subsequent inquest rules her account of events as true.

However, the tide of public opinion soon turns against the Chamberlains. For many, Lindy seems too stoic, too cold-hearted, and too accepting of the disaster that has befallen the family. Gossip about her begins to swell and soon is accepted as statements of fact. The couple's religious beliefs are not widely practised in the country, and when the media report a rumour that the name Azaria means "sacrifice in the wilderness", the public is quick to believe they decapitated their baby with a pair of scissors as part of a bizarre religious rite.

Law-enforcement officials find new witnesses, forensics experts, and circumstantial evidence and reopen the investigation, eventually charging Lindy with murder. Seven months pregnant, she ignores her attorneys' advice to play to the jury's sympathy and appears stoic on the stand, convincing some onlookers of her guilt. As the trial progresses, Michael's faith in his religion and his belief in his wife falter, and he stumbles through his testimony, suggesting he is concealing the truth. In October 1982, Lindy is found guilty and immediately sentenced to life imprisonment with hard labour, while Michael is found guilty as an accessory and given an 18-month suspended sentence.

More than three years later, while searching for the body of an English tourist who fell from Uluru, police discover clothing that is identified as the jacket Lindy had insisted Azaria was wearing over her jumpsuit, which had been recovered early in the investigation. Lindy is immediately released from prison, the case is reopened and all convictions against the Chamberlains are overturned. The film ends with Michael commenting on the ongoing battle to clear the family's name.

Cast
 Meryl Streep as Lindy Chamberlain
 Sam Neill as Michael Chamberlain
 Bruce Myles as Ian Barker, Q.C.
 Neil Fitzpatrick as John Phillips, Q.C.
 Charles 'Bud' Tingwell as Justice James Muirhead
 Maurie Fields as Justice Denis Barritt
 Nick Tate as Det. Graeme Charlwood
 Lewis Fitz-Gerald as Stuart Tipple
 Dorothy Alison as Avis Murchison, Lindy's mother
 Ruby Hunter as Judy Roberts
 Vincent Gil as Roff

Production
John Bryson's book Evil Angels was published in 1985 and film rights were bought by Verity Lambert, who got the interest of Meryl Streep. Robert Caswell wrote a script and Fred Schepisi agreed to direct. The movie was one of the most expensive and elaborate ever shot in Australia, with 350 speaking cast and 4,000 extras.

Reception
In his review in The New York Times, Vincent Canby said the film "has much of the manner of a television docudrama, ultimately being a rather comforting celebration of personal triumph over travails so dread and so particular that they have no truly disturbing, larger application. Yet A Cry in the Dark is better than that, mostly because of another stunning performance by Meryl Streep, who plays Lindy Chamberlain with the kind of virtuosity that seems to redefine the possibilities of screen acting ... Though Sam Neill is very good as Lindy Chamberlain's tormented husband, Miss Streep supplies the guts of the melodrama that are missing from the screenplay."

"Mr. Schepisi has chosen to present the terrible events in the outback in such a way that there's never any doubt in the audience's mind about what happened. The audience doesn't worry about the fate of the Chamberlains as much as it worries about the unconvincing ease with which justice is miscarried. Mr. Schepisi may have followed the facts of the case, but he has not made them comprehensible in terms of the film. The manner by which justice miscarries is the real subject of the movie. In this screenplay, however, it serves only as a pretext for a personal drama that remains chilly and distant ... As a result, the courtroom confrontations are so weakened that A Cry in the Dark becomes virtually a one-character movie. It's Mr. Schepisi's great good fortune that that one character is portrayed by the incomparable Meryl Streep."

Roger Ebert of the Chicago Sun-Times observed, "Schepisi is successful in indicting the court of public opinion, and his methodical (but absorbing) examination of the evidence helps us understand the state's circumstantial case. In the lead role, Streep is given a thankless assignment: to show us a woman who deliberately refused to allow insights into herself. She succeeds, and so, of course, there are times when we feel frustrated because we do not know what Lindy is thinking or feeling. We begin to dislike the character, and then we know how the Australian public felt. Streep's performance is risky, and masterful."

In The Washington Post, Rita Kempley said, "Streep – yes, with another perfect accent – brings her customary skillfulness to the part. It's not a showy performance, but the heroine's internal struggle seems to come from the actress' pores. Neill, who costarred with Streep in Plenty, is quite good as a humble, bewildered sort who finally breaks under cross-examination." Variety made note of the "intimate, incredible detail in the classy, disturbing drama."

On Rotten Tomatoes, the film holds a rating of 94% from 31 reviews.

Box officeEvil Angels grossed A$3,006,964 at the box office in Australia. This was considered a disappointment considering the publicity and subject matter.

Accolades

In popular culture
In 2005, the phrase "The dingo took my baby!", was nominated by the American Film Institute in its list of AFI's 100 Years...100 Movie Quotes. The quote, often incorrectly quoted as "a dingo ate my baby", became part of pop culture after the release of the movie, appearing on such shows as Seinfeld, The Simpsons, Frasier, Supernatural, Buffy the Vampire Slayer, and Baby Daddy, as well as The Rugrats Movie.

In June 2008, the AFI revealed its "Ten Top Ten"—the best ten films in ten "classic" American film genres—after polling over 1,500 people from the creative community. Evil Angels was acknowledged as ninth best in the courtroom drama genre.

See also
 Cinema of Australia
 Trial movies

References
Notes

Bibliography

 Bryson, John. Evil Angels. Ringwood, Australia: Penguin Books, 1985 (first edition). .
 Chamberlain, Lindy. Through My Eyes: Lindy Chamberlain, An Autobiography. Melbourne, Australia: William Heinemann, 1990. .
 Stratton, David. The Avocado Plantation: Boom and Bust in the Australian Film Industry''. London: Pan MacMillan, 1990. .

External links

 
 Evil Angels at Oz Movies
 
 
 
 

1988 films
1988 drama films
1980s English-language films
1980s historical drama films
1980s historical romance films
1980s legal films
1980s mystery films
American legal drama films
Australian films based on actual events
Australian historical drama films
Australian historical romance films
Australian romantic drama films
Courtroom films
Cultural depictions of Australian women
Drama films based on actual events
Films about miscarriage of justice
Films about missing people
Films based on works by Australian writers
Films directed by Fred Schepisi
Films scored by Bruce Smeaton
Films set in the Northern Territory
Films shot in the Northern Territory
Golan-Globus films
Warner Bros. films